Red Patriot was a publication by the Communist Party of Ireland (Marxist–Leninist), it articulated an anti-revisionist outlook on Irish politics and Marxist-Leninist agenda.
Initially Maoist the CPI-ML moved away from Mao and sided with an Albanian articulation of Communism - Hoxhaism. Initially published by the forerunner to the CPI-ML, Irish Revolutionary Youth and launched in 1969, It was produced irregularly throughout the partys history, sometimes as a weekly, sometimes monthly, it was relaunched in 1982 after two years unpublished on the partys twelfth anniversary. It was replaced in 1984 by The Voice of Revolution itself replaced by Marxist-Leninist Weekly.

References

Communist magazines
Defunct magazines published in Ireland
Defunct political magazines
Political magazines published in Ireland
Weekly magazines published in Ireland
Magazines established in 1969
Magazines disestablished in 1984
Newsletters
Marxist magazines